Kaplja Vas is a village in the Municipality of Sevnica in central Slovenia. The area is part of the historical region of Lower Carniola. The municipality is now included in the Lower Sava Statistical Region. 

The local church is dedicated to Saint George and belongs to the Parish of Tržišče. It is a medieval building with a Romanesque nave, a Gothic presbyterium, and the church tower from the 17th century. It stands in the hamlet of Sveti Jurij on St. George's Hill.

References

External links
Kaplja Vas at Geopedia

Populated places in the Municipality of Sevnica